Pizzarotti is a surname. Notable people with the surname include:

 Federico Pizzarotti (born 1973), Italian politician and mayor of Parma

See also
 Impresa Pizzarotti, construction and civil engineering company based in Parma, Italy

Italian-language surnames